Lee Hoon or Lee Hun is a Korean name consisting of the family name Lee and the given name Hoon, and may also refer to:

 Lee Hoon (actor) (born 1973), South Korean actor
 Lee Hun (footballer) (born 1986), South Korean footballer